Spanish settlement in Uruguay, that is the arrival of Spanish emigrants in the country known today as Uruguay, took place firstly in the period before independence from Spain and again in large numbers during the late 19th and early 20th centuries.

History

Settlement 
Between the 15th and early 19th centuries, the Spanish Empire was the sole colonial power in the Banda Oriental. Thus, before 1811, a great part of the European settlers in Uruguay were from Spain and they carried the Spanish colonial administration, including religious affairs, government and commercial business. A substantial Spanish-descended Criollo population gradually built up in the new cities, while some mixed with the indigenous populations (mestizos), with the Black slave population (mulattoes) or with other European immigrants.

Spanish settlement along with the Italians, formed the backbone of today's Uruguayan society. Like its neighbour country Argentina, the culture of Uruguay exhibits significant connections to Spanish culture; in terms of language, customs and traditions.

Many Uruguayans who have a Spanish lineage include those of post-independence Spanish immigrant descent, as long as they have retained a Spanish cultural identity. Large proportions are of Galician descent. During the Spanish Civil War, thousands of Spaniards fled from Spain to Uruguay. The Spanish republicans fled Franco's regime as well, seeking to escape retribution from the new government.

Origin of settlers
The Spanish immigrants arriving between 18th and 20th century have different origins, but a significant number of them are from the Canary Islands, Catalonia, Galicia and the Basque Country.

Basque Country
There was a sizable inflow of Basque migrants in the 19th century in Uruguay. Various reasons drew them to the country: to look for new opportunities, to escape from debt, wars and population growth in homeland. Many of the Basque migrants were from the opportunity-deprived rural areas of the Basque Country, who in most of the time could only choose between migrating to cities or migrating abroad.

Canary Islands
The first Canarian migrants arrived in Uruguay in 1724 and settled themselves around a small fort built by order of Bruno Mauricio de Zabalatwo, the Spanish governor of Buenos Aires, in attempt to keep the Portuguese troops away from the mouth of Rio de la Plata. Men, women and children were among the first 34 migrants and they formed the basis of the early settlement. Two French from Nantes who had previously served the garrison of Buenos Aires were also found among this group.

Two years later, in November 1726, 25 Canarian families arrived. They organised themselves quickly upon their arrival and made substantial contributions to the development of Montevideo. Apart from naming streets and places of the settlement, they also founded the local civil government, allowing Montevideo to gain the status of city in the same year.

Another wave of Canarian settlers consisted of 30 families arrived in Montevideo on 27 March 1729, joined by a few families from Buenos Aires.

The next wave of Canarian migration did not happen until at least 1808, when the Canarian merchant Francisco Aguilar y Leal from Lanzarote sent an expedition of around 200 from the eastern Canary islands to Montevideo. From then on, thousands of Canarians (mostly from Lanzarote and Fuerteventura) had emigrated to Uruguay throughout the 19th century, and in the early 20th century to a lesser extent. More than 10,000 Canarians in total had settled in Uruguay. Accompanying the extensive emigration to Uruguay, a drastic fall in population was recorded across the eastern Canary islands: half of the island of Lanzarote became depopulated as a result of the continuous outward migration.

The majority of around 8,200 arrived in the South American country between 1835 and 1845, constituting 17% of all migrants and 65% of Spanish migrants. However, only 5,749 remained in Uruguay by the end of the 19th century. During this century, Canarians went beyond Montevideo and settled in other parts of the country, namely Maldonado, Canelones, Colonia, San José and Soriano.

Although the specific number of Canarians arriving in Uruguay during the 20th century is not known, it was probably not too large, but enough for specific Canarian organisations to form in the country.

Nowadays, Canarians and their descendants are scattered around the country.

Catalonia

Catalans formed one of the most numerous migrant communities in Uruguay along with Canary Islanders, and were known to have made significant contribution and influences on the Uruguayan society. The Batlle family, originated from Sitges, was a prominent political family of the country. Lorenzo Batlle, born to Catalan parents, was the father of the president José Batlle y Ordóñez and the ancestor of presidents Luis Batlle Berres and Jorge Batlle, all of them from the liberal conservative Colorado Party. José Battle y Ordóñez was responsible for church-state separation, the approval of women's suffrage and the establishment of eight-hour work day.

Recent data
The 2011 Uruguayan census revealed 12,776 people who declared Spain as their country of birth. Thousands of Uruguayan nationals are holders of Spanish passports.

See also
Uruguayan people
Criollo people
Spain-Uruguay relations
White Latin Americans
Spanish colonization of the Americas

Bibliography
 Goebel, Michael. "Gauchos, Gringos and Gallegos: The Assimilation of Italian and Spanish Immigrants in the Making of Modern Uruguay 1880–1930," Past and Present (August 2010) 208(1): 191–229

References

External links
  

European Uruguayan
Spanish diaspora in South America
Uruguay
 
Ethnic groups in Uruguay
Immigration to Uruguay